Sergolexole (developmental code name LY-281,067) is an ergoline derivative which acts as a selective antagonist of the serotonin 5-HT2 receptors. It has been used for various research applications, but was never developed for medical use.

References

5-HT2 antagonists
Ergolines